NXT TakeOver: San Antonio was the 13th NXT TakeOver professional wrestling livestreaming event produced by WWE. It was held exclusively for wrestlers from the promotion's NXT brand division. The event aired exclusively on the WWE Network and took place on January 28, 2017, at the Freeman Coliseum in San Antonio, Texas. It was held as part of that year's Royal Rumble weekend, thus being the first NXT TakeOver to be held in January.

Five matches were contested at the event. In the main event, Bobby Roode defeated Shinsuke Nakamura to win the NXT Championship. In other prominent matches, The Authors of Pain (Akam and Rezar) defeated DIY (Johnny Gargano and Tommaso Ciampa) to win the NXT Tag Team Championship, and Asuka defeated Billie Kay, Peyton Royce, and Nikki Cross in a fatal four-way match to retain the NXT Women's Championship.

Production

Background
TakeOver was a series of professional wrestling shows that began in May 2014, as WWE's then-developmental league NXT held their second WWE Network-exclusive event, billed as TakeOver. In subsequent months, the "TakeOver" moniker became the brand used by WWE for all of their NXT live specials. TakeOver: San Antonio was scheduled as the 13th NXT TakeOver event and was held on January 28, 2017, as a support show for that year's Royal Rumble pay-per-view, which in turn made it the first NXT TakeOver held in January. It was held at the Freeman Coliseum and was named after the venue's city of San Antonio, Texas.

Storylines

The card comprised five matches. The matches resulted from scripted storylines, where wrestlers portrayed heroes, villains, or less distinguishable characters that built tension and culminated in a wrestling match or series of matches. Results were predetermined by WWE's writers on the NXT brand, while storylines were produced on their weekly television program, NXT.

On the December 14, 2016 episode of NXT, Bobby Roode defeated Oney Lorcan to qualify for a #1 contender's fatal 4-way match along with Tye Dillinger, Andrade Cien Almas and Roderick Strong. The following week, Roode defeated Dillinger, Almas and Strong to earn a match for the NXT Championship against Shinsuke Nakamura at TakeOver: San Antonio.

At TakeOver: Toronto on November 19, 2016, DIY defeated The Revival in a two-out-of-three falls match to win the NXT Tag Team Championship. Also on that night, The Authors of Pain defeated TM-61 to win Dusty Rhodes Tag Team Classic. A title match between the two teams was scheduled for TakeOver: San Antonio.

On the January 11, 2017 episode of NXT, it was shown that Billie Kay and Peyton Royce had attacked Asuka earlier in the day. After Kay and Royce defeated Sarah Bridges and Macey Evans, Asuka came down and attacked both. However, both Kay and Royce overpowered Asuka. Nikki Cross then seemingly came to Asuka's aide, however, she attacked Asuka after running Kay and Royce off. The following week, a fatal 4-way match for the NXT Women's Championship between the four women was scheduled for TakeOver: San Antonio.

It was announced via WWE's official website on January 25, 2017, the pre-show panel would consist of Charly Caruso, Raw announcer Corey Graves and the recent United Kingdom Championship Tournament commentator Nigel McGuinness. Graves announced on the Pre-Show that this would be his last TakeOver show as an NXT color commentator before he officially set his role as Raw color commentator. They also hosted the 2016 NXT Year-End Awards.

Event

Preliminary matches 
The event opened with Eric Young facing Tye Dillinger. Young performed "Youngblood" on Dillinger to win the match.

Next, Roderick Strong faced Andrade Cien Almas. Strong performed a "Sick Kick" on Almas to win the match.

After that, DIY (Johnny Gargano and Tommaso Ciampa) defended the NXT Tag Team Championship against The Authors of Pain (Akam and Rezar). Akam and Rezar performed "The Last Chapter" on Ciampa to win the title.

Moments before the fatal-four way women's match, Seth Rollins made an appearance, calling out Triple H. Triple H confronted Rollins and ordered security to eject Rollins from the arena. Rollins attacked a few security guards but was eventually taken away by them.

Later, Asuka defended the NXT Women's Championship against Nikki Cross, Billie Kay and Peyton Royce in a fatal-four way match. Kay and Royce performed a double suplex on Cross through a table near the announce table. Royce performed a gory neckbreaker on Asuka for a near-fall. Asuka performed a spin kick on Kay and a roundhouse kick on Royce to retain the title.

Main event 
In the main event, Shinsuke Nakamura defended the NXT Championship against Bobby Roode. Roode targeted Nakamura's leg throughout the match which injured him. Nakamura performed a "Kinshasa" on Roode for a near-fall. Nakamura performed a second "Kinshasha" on Roode but was unable to pin him. Roode performed a "Glorious DDT" on Nakamura for a near-fall. Roode performed a second "Glorious DDT" to win the title.

Results

References

External links 
 

San Antonio
2017 WWE Network events
2017 in Texas
Events in San Antonio
Professional wrestling in San Antonio
January 2017 events in the United States